The Mainichi Film Award for Best Actor is a film award given at the Mainichi Film Awards.

Award Winners

References

Film awards for lead actor
Awards established in 1947
1947 establishments in Japan
Actor
Lists of films by award